Jaiveer Singh is an Indian politician and member of the 18th Uttar Pradesh Legislative Assembly. He
belongs to Bharatiya Janata Party & represented the Mainpuri Sadar Constituency of Uttar Pradesh.
He was appointed the Minister of Tourism & Culture in the Government of Uttar Pradesh.
He entered politics in 1984 & after that, he was elected as MLA from Ghiror in 2002
& appointed State Minister (Medical & Health) in the Government of Uttar Pradesh in 2003.
He completed his tenure by 2006. He performed his duty as Minister of State with
Independent Charge for Irrigation Department in the Government of Uttar Pradesh from 2007
to 2012.

Early life 
Jaiveer Singh was born on 2nd October 1958 in the village Karhara, district Firozabad
(Erstwhile District Mainpuri). Inspired by his father's ideas of social harmony, his interest in
the political field increased. He started working in Youth Congress in student life. After
entering student politics, he participated in various movements as an active politician and was
elected as an MLA for the first time in 2002.

Political background 

Jaiveer Singh is the Minister of Tourism & Culture in the Government of Uttar Pradesh. After entering politics, he has been the president of Aaron Block from 1984 to 1989 & has been the village Pradhan of the Karhara Village from 1988 to 1995. He worked as General Secretary of the district Congress Committee from 1989 to 1994. After that, he worked as Vice President of the Youth Congress Committee from 1994 to 1996. He
spent three tenures as the president of District Co-operative Bank Firozabad from 1999 to
2008. He has been the MLA of Ghiror Mainpuri from 2002 to 2012. In 2003 he was appointed State Minister (Medical & Health) & then, he was appointed the Minister of State with Independent Charge for the Department of Irrigation in the Government of Uttar Pradesh from 2007 to 2012. 

He was elected as MLA from Mainpuri Sadar, Mainpuri & working as the Minister of Tourism & Culture in the Government of Uttar Pradesh.

Political career

Positions held

External links
 Official website

References

Living people
People from Mainpuri
Members of the Uttar Pradesh Legislative Council
Bharatiya Janata Party politicians from Uttar Pradesh
Uttar Pradesh MLAs 2022–2027
1958 births